Magana is a monotypic genus of Arabian cellar spiders containing the single species, Magana velox. It was first described by B. A. Huber and L. S. Carvalho in 2019, and it has only been found in Oman.

See also
 List of Pholcidae species

References

Monotypic Pholcidae genera
Endemic fauna of Oman